The 2011–12 Dayton Flyers men's basketball team represented the University of Dayton during the 2011–12 NCAA Division I men's basketball season. The Flyers, led by first year head coach Archie Miller, played their home games at the University of Dayton Arena and are members of the Atlantic 10 Conference. They finished the season 20–13 9–7 in A-10 to finish in a four way tie for fifth place. They were champions of the 2011 Old Spice Classic. They lost in the quarterfinals of the A-10 Basketball tournament to Xavier. They were invited to the 2012 National Invitation Tournament where they lost in the first round to Iowa.

Roster

Schedule

|-
!colspan=9 style=| Exhibition

|-
!colspan=9 style=| Regular season

|-
!colspan=9 style=| Atlantic 10 tournament

|-
!colspan=9 style=| NIT

References

Dayton Flyers men's basketball seasons
Dayton
Dayton
Dayton
Dayton